HC Pustertal Wölfe – Val Pusteria Wolves are an Italian professional ice hockey team from Bruneck, currently playing, as of the 2021–22 season, in the ICE Hockey League (ICEHL). They formerly played in the Alps Hockey League and Serie A.

Team history
The team was founded in 1954 as "EV Bruneck MAK" and played the first season in the Serie B in 1966. They won the championship in 1967–68 and 1968–69, but could not move up to the Seria A because their stadium was unfit for the top series. In 1971–72 they won the B championship and in 1972–73 they entered the Serie A for the first time. The Wolves played in Serie A for nearly thirty years in a row. The best results they achieved were second place in the 1981–82 season and third place in 1980–81.

Before the beginning of the 2001–02 season the Wolves were forced to leave Serie A due to financial reasons, but in 2003–04 the team returned to the league. The team name was changed in 2008 and in 2010. The official name is now "HC Pustertal Wölfe – Val Pusteria Wolves".

Ahead of the 2021–22 season HC Pustertal joined the Austrian Hockey League (ICEHL).

Home arena
Until 2021 the Wolves home was the Rienzstadion, formerly called Leitner Solar Arena in Bruneck-Außerragen.

With the beginning of the 2021–22 season the HC Pustertal moved to its new home arena, the Intercable Arena in Bruneck, located in the western outskirts of the town.

Honours

Pre-season
Tatra Cup
  Winners (1): 2021

References

External links
 Official website

Ice hockey teams in Italy
Alpenliga teams
Ice hockey clubs established in 1954
1954 establishments in Italy
Bruneck
Sport in South Tyrol